Mylothris alcuana is a butterfly in the family Pieridae. It is found in Cameroon, Equatorial Guinea, the Republic of the Congo, the Democratic Republic of the Congo and Zambia. The habitat consists of rainforests.

Subspecies
Mylothris alcuana alcuana (Cameroon, Equatorial Guinea, Congo, northern Democratic Republic of the Congo)
Mylothris alcuana binza Berger, 1981 (Democratic Republic of the Congo: Kinshasa, Sankuru)
Mylothris alcuana shaba Berger, 1981 (Democratic Republic of the Congo (Kasai, Lualaba, Haut-Shaba), Zambia)

References

Butterflies described in 1910
Taxa named by Karl Grünberg
Pierini